Ruşor may refer to several places in Romania:

 Rușor, a village in Pui Commune, Hunedoara County
 Rușor, a village in Copalnic-Mănăștur Commune, Maramureș County
 Rușor (river), a river in Hunedoara County